John Chaunce may refer to:

John Chaunce (fl. 1363–1388), MP for Reigate
John Chaunce (fl. 1406–1409), MP for Reigate